"Démons" is a song by Angèle featuring Damso. It was released on 3 December 2021.

Charts

Weekly charts

Year-end charts

Certifications

References

2021 songs
2021 singles
Angèle (singer) songs